Powellton or Powelton may refer to:

Powellton, California
Powelton, Georgia
Powellton, Illinois
Powelton Club, a golf course in Balmville, New York
Powelton Village, Philadelphia, Pennsylvania
The Powelton, a historic apartment complex in Powelton Village
Powellton, Virginia
Powellton, West Virginia